Acetone cyanohydrin (ACH) is an organic compound used in the production of methyl methacrylate, the monomer of the transparent plastic polymethyl methacrylate (PMMA), also known as acrylic. It liberates hydrogen cyanide easily, so it is used as a source of such.  For this reason, this cyanohydrin is also highly toxic.

Preparation
In the laboratory, this compound may be prepared by treating sodium cyanide with acetone, followed by acidification:

Considering the high toxicity of acetone cyanohydrin, a lab scale production has been developed using a microreactor-scale  flow chemistry to avoid needing to manufacture and store large quantities of the reagent. Alternatively, a simplified procedure involves the action of sodium or potassium cyanide on the sodium bisulfite adduct of acetone prepared in situ. This gives a less pure product, one that is nonetheless suitable for most syntheses.

Reactions
Acetone cyanohydrin is an intermediate en route to methyl methacrylate.  Treatment with sulfuric acid gives the sulfate ester of the methacrylamide, methanolysis of which gives ammonium bisulfate and methyl methacrylate.

It is used as a surrogate in place of HCN, as illustrated by its use as a precursor to lithium cyanide:
(CH3)2C(OH)CN  +  LiH   →  (CH3)2CO  +  LiCN  +  H2

In transhydrocyanation, an equivalent of HCN is transferred from acetone cyanohydrin to another acceptor, with acetone as byproduct.  The transfer is an equilibrium process, initiated by base. The reaction can be driven by trapping reactions or by the use of a superior HCN acceptor, such as an aldehyde. In the hydrocyanation reaction of butadiene, the transfer is irreversible.

Natural occurrence
Cassava tubers contain linamarin, a glucoside of acetohydrin, and the enzyme linamarase for hydrolysing the glucoside. Crushing the tubers releases these compounds and produces acetone cyanohydrin.

Safety

Acetone cyanohydrin is classified as an extremely hazardous substance in the US Emergency Planning and Community Right-to-Know Act and carries an RCRA P069 waste code. The principal hazards of acetone cyanohydrin arise from its ready decomposition on contact with water, which releases highly toxic hydrogen cyanide.

References

External links

CDC - NIOSH Pocket Guide to Chemical Hazards - Acetone Cyanohydrin

Cyanohydrins